Coalburn railway station served Coalburn, a village in South Lanarkshire, Scotland. It opened in 1891 and was closed in 1965.

References

Disused railway stations in South Lanarkshire
Railway stations in Great Britain opened in 1891
Railway stations in Great Britain closed in 1965
Former Caledonian Railway stations